Duntara is a town located north west of Catalina, Newfoundland and Labrador. Duntara was an Incorporated Community on October 21, 1961.

Demographics 

See also
 List of cities and towns in Newfoundland and Labrador

References

Towns in Newfoundland and Labrador